A jungle chip, or jungle IC, is an integrated circuit (IC or "chip") found in most analog televisions of the 1990s. It takes a composite video signal from the radio frequency receiver electronics and turns it into separate RGB outputs that can be sent to the cathode ray tube to produce a display. This task had previously required separate analog circuits.

Advanced versions generally had a second set of inputs in RGB format that were used to overlay on-screen display imagery. These would be connected to a microcontroller that would handle operations like tuning, sleep mode and running the remote control. A separate input called "blanking" switched the jungle outputs between the two inputs on the fly. This was normally triggered at a fixed location on the screen, creating rectangular areas with the digital data overlaying the television signal. This was used for on-screen channel displays, closed captioning support, and similar duties.

The internal RGB inputs have led to such televisions having a revival in the retrocomputing market. By running connectors from the RGB pins on the jungle chip to connectors added by the user, typically RCA jacks on the back of the television case, and then turning on the blanking switch permanently, the system is converted to an RGB monitor. Since early computers output signals with television timings, NTSC or PAL, using a jungle chip television avoids the need to provide separate timing signals. This contrasts with multisync monitors or similar designs that do not have any "built-in" timing and have separate inputs for these signals.

Examples of jungle chips include the Motorola MC65585, Phillips RDA6361 and Sony CXA1870.

References
 
 

Integrated circuits
Analog video connectors